Hori's nevus (also known as "Acquired bilateral nevus of Ota-like macules") is a cutaneous condition characterized by multiple brown–gray to brown–blue macules, primarily in the malar region of the face.

See also 
 Nevus of Ota
 List of cutaneous conditions

References 

Melanocytic nevi and neoplasms